MTV Roadies Shortcut To Hell is the eighth season of MTV Roadies, a reality television show aired on MTV India. The season 8 of roadies was also known as "Shortcut To Hell" as the second half of the season took place in Brazil. The audition episodes were aired from 22 January 2011 and the journey episodes began airing on 5 March 2011. Its auditions were held in various cities of India, like Ahmedabad, Kolkata, Bengaluru, Chandigarh, Delhi and Pune. The audition is done by Raghu Ram, Rajiv Laxman and Rannvijay Singh. The title was won by Aanchal Khurana from Delhi.

Avtar Nischal, Suchit Vikram Singh,  and Mohit Saggar returned as All-Stars for Roadies X - Battle for Glory. Nischal withdrew in mid-season, Singh finished in 10th place and Saggar eventually placed as 2nd Runner-up.

Destination
Mtv Roadies 8 was held halfway in India and the other half was continued in Sao Paulo, Brazil. However, The series's Finale concluded in India. The finale included Ex- Roadies as well who have been previously Voted out of the show.

Roadies' selection

Overall Count :

Contestants
There were thirteen contestants overall.

The Total Votes is the number of votes a roadie has received during Vote-outs where the roadie is eligible to be eliminated from the game. It does not include the votes received during the finale where the finalists are voted for the win.

Episode 1: 05-Mar-2011

All the thirteen contestants arrived in Bangalore and met each other. Renee and Prachi got into an argument. Rannvijay then entered and asked a few questions. Later he asked them to select the biggest loser amongst them. Suraj got selected. Later he was asked to elect a leader. Finally Suraj selected Dev.

The roadies then got a scroll to put on their dancing shoes. That night they partied and after a photo shoot with Rannvijay, they realized that they are partying in the vote-out location, where Raghu & Rajeev were also present. Everyone wrote a guy's & a girl's name. They voted like this:

Suchit - Suraj & Prachi
Renee - Suraj & Prachi
Anchal - Mohit & Prachi
Prachi - Suraj & Renee
Mohit - Rahul & Prachi
Suraj - Suchit & Anchal
Avtar - Mohit & Chandni
Rahul - Avtar & Anchal
Chandni - Avtar & Renee
Pooja - Rahul & Renee
Anamika - Avtar & Anchal
Vibhor - Mohit & Prachi
Dev - Rahul & Chandni

Prachi got 5 votes & there was a tie between Avtar, Suraj, Mohit & Rahul. A wild-card draw voted Avtar voted out. Then Raghu announced that they were actually immune and they will select three roadies each to compete and one of the selected six will be voted out in the next episode.

Episode 2: 12-Mar-2011

In this episode Avtar chose Suchit, Mohit and Rahul to compete in the rock climbing immunity task. Also Renee, Anchal and Chandni were selected by Prachi to compete in the same task. Rahul and Mohit couldn't complete the challenge. Only Suchit completed the challenge so he became immune. In girls none could complete the challenge but Chandni was better than Anchal in the competition so she became immune too. Prachi had a big fight with Avtar. Then finally on vote out Rahul got voted out. Dev and Avtar were revealed to be plotting against all others by staging a fight.
Roadie voted out - Rahul (by 6 votes)

Episode 3: 19-Mar-2011
The roadies went to Davangere for their next tasks.

Money Task
The Roadies were divided into three groups of 4. One in each team was asked not to compete. So, Dev, Pooja & Anchal were left out. Of the rest, one was supposed to find some work for the other to do in exchange for some food items. The third had to make good deals on SnapDeal.com based on the items they collect. Suraj (Worker), Avtar (Collector) and Mohit (Seller) were the only qualified team. The others were disqualified. Avtar, Suraj and Mohit were able to collect 8,400.

Immunity Task
The Roadies were asked to pair-up (Girl-Boy) with the one who they hated. The girls were asked questions and if they got it wrong, the partner (boy) will get a bikini wax (Brazilian wax). Dev backed out, so Renee could not compete. After many rounds Anamika-Vibhor won immunity.

Roadie voted out - Avtar (by 8 votes)

Episode 4: 26-Mar-2011

For the next tasks, Roadies travelled to Belgaum. Dev was in trouble due to Avtar’s revelation at the previous vote-out. Pooja was made captain.

Money Task
The Roadies had to go against Lajja Goswami on a shooting challenge to earn money. Lajja would shoot and the roadies in pair have to match her score. Each point was worth 1000. The deficit has to be earned by Suchit (The one left out without a pair) by letting two bodybuilders, hit him on his behind with a bat. The scores were -
1. Lajja - 8 against Dev - 2 and Mohit - 4. Suchit earned 2.
2. Lajja - 9 against Renee - 0 and Anchal - 0. Suchit refused to get hit.
3. Lajja - 10 against Pooja - 0 and Anamika - 8. Suchit earned 2.
4. Lajja - 10 against Vibhor - 2 and Suraj - 7. Suchit earned 1.
5. Lajja - 10 against Prachi - 8 and Chandini - 0. Suchit earned 2.
Finally Suchit shot a 9 and the others had to get 9 hits to earn 9000 more. Suraj, Vibhor, Mohit were hit twice each, while Dev chose to get hit thrice. The money earned was 47,000. Total in the account is now - 56,400.
In their room, Suchit got a black box, which had a Vardhan or a Shrap, which will be revealed later. He was given a choice to keep it or give it to another roadie. He kept it and got a shrap (curse) that he can't participate in the immunity task and he was not safe in the vote out.

Immunity Task
The roadies were made into two teams. Team 1{Pooja, Anamika, Vibhor, Dev & Renee} and Team 2{Suraj, Mohit, Anchal, Prachi & Chandini} had to do pull a bullock cart, which lacked a wheel and the bullocks from start to finish. A member from other team will put weight on it to make the task difficult. Vibhor & Pooja became the bulls and Dev became the wheel. Chandini added weights. They did not finish as Dev fell down. In the next team, Suraj & Anchal became the bulls and Mohit became the wheel. Anamika added weights. They finished and won immunity.
Roadie voted out - Dev (by 8 votes)

Episode 5: 2-Apr-2011

For the next task, Roadies travelled to Kolhapur. Renee was made captain. On Rannvijay's request, she selected Chandini as the co-captain

Special Task
Rannvijay asked them to form two teams.
A - Renee, Suchit, Mohit, Anchal & Prachi
B - Chandini, Anamika, Pooja, Suraj & Vibhor.

For this task, Raghu and Rajiv met the roadies. They were insulted for their lack of courage and guts. Then they were given two options. Take a shortcut for the next task or play normally. They were told that if the team selected shortcut & lost, their lives will be made miserable. Also if they go the normal route and the other team takes a shortcut and wins, their life will be made miserable again.

After some consideration, both teams decided that they will take a shortcut to victory. The task was simple match the following. On one column were events/organizations and they had to be matched with the people. The team with shortest time would win. For every correct match, 5s will be deducted from their total time & for every wrong one, 10s will be added.

Both team played separately and matched -

Event/Org - Team A - Team B

Lala Lajpat Rai - Bipin Chandra Pal - Bipin Chandra Pal
Bal Gangadhar Tilak

Azad Hind Fauj - Netaji Subhash Chandra Bose - Chandrasekar Azad

Vande Mataram - Bakim Chandra Chaterjee - Bakim Chandra Chaterjee

Dandi March - M K Gandhi - M K Gandhi

Sardar Vallabai Patel - Iron Man of India - Iron Man of India

Grand Old Man of India - Dada Bhai Naoroji - Dada Bhai Naoroji

Khilafat Movement - Maulana Mohamad Ali - Maulana Mohamad Ali

Sepoy Mutiny - Mangal Pandey - Mangal Pandey

Hindustan Socialist - Chandrasekar Azad - Netaji Subhash Chandra Bose
Republic Association

Jallianwala Bagh - Brigdler General, Reging Dyer - Brigdler General, Reging Dyer

Team A managed to match all correctly in 6:20 min. Team B made two mistakes and finished in around 2:42 min. After the time adjustments, Team B won. When they asked what shortcut they had used, all were puzzled. Raghu then demonstrated. He matched randomly in few seconds. After the penalty seconds addition, he still won. This he said was the shortcut. All were ashamed.

As Team A had lost, they were asked to make pair up boy-girl for their next task. Suchit chose Renee and Mohit chose Anchal.

Episode 6: 9-Apr-2011

The next task was the immunity task for the losing team of the special task. Among the pair, one had to set themselves on fire and run for a max of 20 sec. The other roadie had to cut planks of woods with the axe. If the roadie on fire gives up before 20 sec, the other roadie has to stop cutting. The girls decide to light themselves and the boys decide to cut.

Mohit could cut 9 planks and Suchit could cut 11 planks in 20sec. After this Raghu declared that Renee-Suchit were not immune yet. Prachi was then given an opportunity to find a partner from the other immune team to compete. She chose Anamika, who gave up her immunity to help her. Anamika managed to cut 12 planks and won the immunity back. For this performance, she won a Karizma Bike

The vote-out saw some twists. Raghu declared that two people will leave. Prachi was asked to select one of the other pairs who performed the task. She chose Suchit-Renee. Mohit & Anchal were asked to vote-out one of them and the other will vote-out one among Mohit and Anchal. There was a tie as Mohit chose Renee and Aanchal chose Suchit, so Prachi was asked to select a member form immune roadies by lucky draw. She selected Suraj. He eliminated Renee. Suchit was then asked to eliminate a roadie from the other pair. He selected Anchal.

Renee lashed out against Suraj and then Prachi for the vote-out.

Roadies voted out - Renee and Anchal

Episode 7: 16-Apr-2011

The next destination for the roadies was Satara.

Money Task
For this task, the guys were asked to defend themselves against the boxer, Vijender Singh in an enclosed box. They had to face 3 rounds each. They were paid for each second they faced in the ring.
Suchit managed 5 seconds and 35 milliseconds
Mohit managed 4 seconds and 38 milliseconds
Vibhor managed 5 seconds and 18 milliseconds
Suraj managed 5 seconds and 66 milliseconds
They had total of 20 seconds and 57 milliseconds and got 5000 for each seconds. They won 1,05,000. Total money in account - 1,60,400

In the hotel, Radhika Palace, Roadies got a grand welcome. Later Suraj was given the black box, which had shrap and vardhan.

Karizma Advantage Task
There was no immunity task and all were declared immune. Suraj gave the black box to Prachi. As a shrap, she lost her immunity. As the vardhan, she was asked to select an opponent. She chose Chandini. They formed a team of three and all lost their immunity
A - Prachi, Suchit & Mohit
B - Chandini, Pooja & Suraj
Only Anamika & Vibhor were immune. On two poles, a box and a key kept. Prachi and Chandini were suspended on a rope and had to swing and pick the key and then open the box. Their respective timers were the other two roadies on a bike. A rider had to drive slowly on a path without putting the leg down with a pavilion rider.
Both Prachi & Chandini could not finish. Prachi's rider, Mohit drove for 42 sec. Chandini's rider, Suraj drove for 1:49 min, So Chandini won. Later Rannvijay demonstrated the technique to do the task.
For his riding, Suraj won a Karizma bike and he was extremely happy.

Vote-Out
As the winner of the challenge, Chandini got 3 votes at the vote-out. She was asked to keep her votes in 3 separate columns. The Other roadies were asked to keep their vote in one of the pile till it reached 3. Suraj did not get to vote as he refused to give up his Karizma. Rannvijay said that one of the piles would be used for the vote-out. Suraj was asked to pick the pile. He selected col 2. His second choice was col 1, to be used in case of no tie in col 2.
Col 1 - Mohit, Mohit, Mohit
Col 2 - Mohit, Prachi, Prachi
Col 3 - Mohit, Chandini, Prachi

Roadie voted out - Prachi Agarwal

Episode 8: 23-Apr-2011

The next destination for the roadies was Pune. Chandini became the captain. It was the last destination in India. Next stop is Brazil. The episode started with a vote-out, where Mohit was voted-out. Later Raghu appeared with a twist. The flashback-

Revenge for vote-out Task I
This task was the current roadies versus the ex-roadies, where the ex-roadies had a chance at revenge and take money from roadies account. It was a sort of Kabaddi match. The roadies were asked to defend their money. Their account money was rounded to 2,00,000.
A bag with 15,000 would be kept on one side of the crease. A roadie or an ex-roadie would have to pick it up and run across to the other end. Two ex-roadies or roadies would stop them.
 Rahul against Mohit & Suchit. He lost and roadies saved their money
 Anchal against Pooja & Anamika. She lost and roadies saved their money
 Avtar against Mohit & Suchit. He lost and roadies saved their money
 Renee against Pooja & Anamika. She lost and roadies saved their money
 Mohit against Rahul & Avtar. He won and roadies saved their money
 Pooja against Anchal & Renee. She lost and roadies lost 15,000
 Suchit against Rahul & Avtar. He won and roadies saved their money
 Anamika against Anchal & Renee. She lost and roadies lost 15,000
They then went back to the same hotel and had some friction between them.

Revenge for vote-out Task II
Roadies had to go through another task to save their money. This time it was blackjack with Raghu as their dealer. Dev and Vibhor went to play with 1,30,000 each. After 5 rounds of playing, Roadies lost another 30,000. Their account money was reduced to 1,40,000.

Vote-Out
After Mohit's vote-out, Raghu appeared and bring in a twist. He gave Mohit an option to trade all the roadies' money for his immunity. He took it. The account money got reduced to zero and another vote-out happened.

Roadie voted out - Chandini (by 5 votes)

Episode 9: 30-April-2011

The roadies flew to São Paulo, Brazil and voted Mohit their next captain. They enjoyed some time enjoying the place and then went for their money task.

Money Task
The Roadies were asked to form words with some letters. The letters were written on bodies for two girls and a guy covered in chilli paste. Anamika and Pooja decided to lick the girls and Suraj licked the guy to get the letters. Vibhor, with Mohit and Suchit's help made words. They got 1000 for 3-lettered words, 2000 for 4-lettered words and 3000 for 5-lettered words. They won a total of 85,000.

Immunity Task
Raghu surprised the roadies with a few wild-card entries. Tamanna & Paulomi from Roadies 6.0 and Ashutosh & Nihal from Roadies 5.0 joined the team. Raghu declared that they cannot be voted-out and they will be a huge part in the tasks for the other roadies.

The immunity task was saving goals made by profession football players. This task was for the roadies' immunity but performed by ex-roadies. Paulomi refused to do the task and Tamanna demanded a Karizma for performing. Later she agreed to do it without it. All three missed the goals. Finally, Nihal & Ashutosh together saved a goal and won one immunity. They were asked to decide who they would give it to.

Vote-Out
In the vote-out, the ex-roadies gave the immunity to Mohit. After a vote-out, there was a tie between Vibhor and Suraj. The ex-roadies were asked to vote to settle the tie.

Roadie voted out - Vibhor (by 3 votes)

Episode 10: 7-May-2011

For their next tasks, the roadies & ex-roadies went to Ribeirão Preto. This time Anamika was voted the captain.

Money Task
The roadies and ex-roadies went to an auditorium where a rock-concert was being held by "Os Virgens". For the money task, the boys were asked to get a nude portrait done by Cordeiro de Sá, a local artist, during the rock concert while the audience were still watching. Suraj backed-out. Mohit & Suchit got it done and won 2,00,000. The total in the account is now 2,85,000.

After the task, the roadies went back to their room where they got a black box. It has 2 curse and 1 blessing. Anamika got it and she got an option of keeping it or giving it away. All taunted Suraj for giving up.

Immunity Task
At the immunity task location, Anamika declared that she wants to keep the box. The 2 shraps were, she was not immune and she has to participate in the task. The vardhan would be told to her later. The roadies were asked to make two teams. The teams were, Mohit-Suchit and Suraj-Pooja. Anamika was tied to a circle and she became the target for paint-ball gun.

The ex-roadies were asked to fire. Each team were asked to pull the circles and save Anamika from being targeted. Paulomi refused to participate, so other three ex-roadies played. Mohit-Suchit saved more shots, so they won the immunity task.

The Vardhan was reveal one among them to be immune.

Vote-Out
In the vote-out, the ex-roadies also voted. Anamika made Suchit immune. To save himself, Suraj gave Tamana his bike. The votes were - Suraj-4, Mohit-4 and Pooja-1. Nihal had voted for Pooja, so he was asked to vote again.

Roadie voted out - Suraj (by 5 votes)

Episode 11: 14-May-2011

For their next tasks, the roadies & ex-roadies went to Poços de Caldas. It was a wild-card entry task for already voted-out roadies.

Wild-Card Task
The roadies selected for wild card were Reene, Anchal, Rahul and Dev. Rannvijay declared that one guy and one girl would enter the competition again. The task to be done needed teams. It was girls vs. the guys. A rope would hang one of the girl/guy and hands would be tied behind and would stand on a trapdoor. He/She has to untie the knot and remove the rope. Meanwhile, his/her team-member would be holding the trap door from below while high-pressure water would be sprayed on them.

Dev decided to be the hangman and Rahul stood below. They finished the task in 1 minute and 33 seconds. Then Anchal decided to be the hangman and Reene held the trap door. They finished the task in 1 minute and 12 seconds.

After the task, Dev got all worked up and started screaming at Suchit that he will hit him. In the hotel, he got into a fight with Suchit.

Raghu's special Task
After the fight, Raghu met with all and announced that he is very angry with Dev for hitting Suchit. He gave Suchit a chance to get back at him. Both Suchit & Dev's hands were tied up. They had to kick each other and make the other fall. Suchit would win if Dev falls 3 times. Dev would win if Suchit falls 7 times. Suchit's victory would be considered as Rahul's victory.

In the first round, no one fell. So the rules were modified slightly. Each round was to last 3 minutes. If no one falls, the number of fall needed will be reduced for both. In the 2nd round, Dev fell once and then he gave up and Suchit won.

Vote-In
For the vote-in, the roadies were asked to vote and decided which guy should return to roadies. Rahul was selected unanimously. The ex-roadies had to select between the girls. This caused a huge rift between Reene and Anchal. Finally it was a tie. Reene and Anchal selected Pooja to be the tiebreaker and she selected Anchal.

Roadies voted in - Anchal and Rahul
Roadies sent back - Reene and Dev

Episode 12: 21-May-2011

For their next tasks, the roadies & ex-roadies went to Juiz de Fora. Mohit became the captain.

Money Task
For the money task, the girls were asked to observe a street Samba dance. The guys were asked to rest as the task was for just the girls. They had to prepare and Samba on the street. The crowd around the market were given beads. The girls were asked to get it from them after the dance. The girls got a 2-hour dance lesson. Anchal went first and she did the task well. Anamika went next, but it was not great and got criticized by Tamana. Pooja went next and did extremely well. When Pooja came, she suddenly slipped. But she didn't lose the spirit. She stood up and continued dancing. everyone cheered her on and enjoyed her performance. Aanchal & Anamika had to go to the people to get the beads. But, when Pooja completed the task, people came to her and covered with beads. Anchal got 26 beads. Anamika got 23 and Pooja got 66. Only hers were counted and given 1,500 for each bead. The roadies account now has 2,85,000 + 99,000 = 3,84,000

Back in the room
When the roadies went back to the room, a scroll came. It asked Ashutosh & Paulomi to leave. Tamana was visibly upset. After that another scroll came that asked the roadies to form 2 groups. After some heated discussions, the groups were made.
A - Anamika, Pooja, Mohit & Nihal
B - Anchal, Suchit, Rahul & Tamana

The teams went to an old train junkyard and entered two different compartments. Raghu and Rajiv were waiting for them.

Episode 13: 28-May-2011

After the encounter with Raghu & Rajiv, the roadies were shocked. Then they are given some choices similar to the Prisoner's dilemma. Both the teams were given an advantage and a choice. They can take a shortcut and give back the advantage or keep the advantage to face a task. If A takes the shortcut & B does not, team B will have to face a wrestler to win the advantage and vice versa. If both do not take the shortcut, they have to fight with a wrestler each and the winner gets the advantage. If both take the shortcut, they will have to face two wrestlers each.

Advantage Task
Both teams decided to take the shortcut. So they both had to fight two wrestlers. Mohit selected himself and Rahul to fight. They both had to defend themselves for three rounds. The one that defended for a longer time, wins. Rahul went first & broke a rule. He attacked a wrestler after the fight was over. So he was disqualified. Mohit automatically won. But to prove a point, he also fought. He performed very well and was appreciated by all.

Back in the room, the advantage was revealed. The team with advantage had to convince two others from the opposite team to make them safe. All tried their very best.

Vote-Out
In the vote-out, only Mohit manages to get two votes to make him immune & became safe. He was the first to go to Rio de Janeiro, the last destination in Brazil. The ex-roadies also voted. After the vote, there was a tie between Pooja & Rahul (They got 3 votes each. The remaining two were for Suchit). The ex-roadies were asked to decide the tie

Roadie voted out - Rahul

Episode 14: 4-June-2011

The roadies and ex-roadies were asked to drive down to Rio de Janeiro for their next tasks.

Money Task
In the beginning of the task, Rannvijay gave the roadies 2,00,000. They were then asked to play Footvolley with 2 champions. The first round was for 10 points. For each point lost, the roadies lose 10,000. They get only 2 points & end up losing 80,000.

For the next round, only two roadies at a time had to face them. The roadies could play Beach volleyball. Ex-roadies were also allowed to help. Suchit, Mohit, Anamika & Nihal took turns and they could get only 1 point. They lost 1,00,000 more. The total roadies account came to, 4,04,000. Rannvijay rounded it off to 4,00,000.

Vote-Out
The roadies went for a task, but they were told that there will be a direct vote-out & two of them would leave. The roadies were given an option to decide if the ex-roadies should vote or not. Only Pooja wanted them to vote, so they were asked not to vote. But when Rannvijay asked them unofficially they selected
1. Nihal - Pooja & Anamika
2. Tammana - Mohit & Aanchal

Roadies voted like this :

1. Aanchal - pooja & anamika
2. Mohit - pooja & anamika
3. Pooja - suchit & aanchal 
4. Anamika - pooja & suchit
5. Suchit - pooja & anamika

After the counting the votes were - Suchit{2}, Mohit{0}, Aanchal{1}, Pooja{4} & Anamika{3}. Pooja & Anamika were voted-out. After that Rannvijay gave them a chance to come back into the competition.

Karizma Task
Pooja & Anamika were asked to pass through ten Capoeira artists and touch a Karizma kept at the end. Every time they get touched, they would be penalized with 2 minutes. Pooja went first & finish in 1 minute & 22 seconds with one penalty. Anamika went next and finished in 1 minute 32 seconds with 3 penalties. Pooja came back to the competition & also got a Karizma.

Roadie voted out - Anamika

Episode 15: 11-June-2011

The roadies flew back to Bangalore for their finals. They had a surprise waiting for them. Raghu, Rajiv & Rannvijay introduced them to a new set of ex-roadies to help them in the finals. Nihal from before, Shaleen from season 4, Parul from season 3, Mohit from season 7 & Kiri from season 6. The voted-out roadies also arrived and lashed out on them.

Re-Enter Task
To make some things right, Raghu decided to give Prachi another chance because her vote-out was because of a twist. She was asked to challenge a female contestant. She chose Aanchal.

There were three doors. They had a thin man, a body builder & a tractor behind them. Prachi was asked to choose one door randomly and play tug-of-war with what was behind it. Aanchal had to face the same thing. Prachi went first & ended up choosing the body builder. Her tug-of-war lasted 18 seconds. Aanchal went next and her tug-of-war lasted 25 seconds, making her the winner.

Vote-Out
When the roadies went back to the room, they were told that there will be a vote-out to remove of among the finalist. The finalists were asked to choose an ex-roadie to vote on their behalf. During the vote-out, Kiri got 3 votes and Mohit got one. They voted and there was a tie between Pooja & Mohit. The remaining ex-roadies voted to break the tie.

Roadies voted out - Pooja ban

Episode 16: 18-June-2011

The senior roadies were given a black-box and also the choice to select the roadie who gets it. They selected Anchal and she got an advantage in the next task.

Finals - I
In a purely luck-oriented task, Suchit and Mohit were asked to stand in any 2 out of 3 cages which were strategically placed behind 2 sets of 3 glasses. Anchal was asked to sit in a jeep and select the cage where Suchit and Mohit can be. She selected a cage and Suchit was eliminated. If she had selected an empty cage, she would have gotten eliminated. Many ex-roadies cried as they wanted Suchit to emerge out as the final winner. Later in the show, Suchit was given a Hero Honda Karizma for his great performance throughout the competition.

Finals - II
Finally, among the final 2 roadies, a vote-out was done. The roadies were asked to remove 2 eliminated roadies each (Aanchal - Suchit & Rahul, Mohit - Renee & Chandini) and one together (Prachi). They were replaced by the senior roadies for the final vote-out. Aanchal won by a whopping 9-1, with only Suraj voting for Mohit. Raghu And Rajiv congratulated that winning with the wild card was a great thing.

Although, she won the Roadies 8 but all the roadie fans were highly disappointed. The show and the hosts Raghu and Rajiv received a lot of negative comments on all the networking sites including the official MTV sites. She was rated by many as the most non-deserving roadie winner ever. Raghu and Rajiv were criticized for making the complete season girl-biased.

Roadies voted out: Mohit

MTV Roadies 8 winner: Aanchal

Ratings and reception

MTV Roadies had the peak TRP of 3.25, however ratings began to decline after roadies' trip to Brazil as the tasks became more and more awkward involving nudity etc. This enraged many audience members and created an outrage among viewers. Currently MTV roadies 8 has only managed to reach 1.17 rating according to the Indian rating system.

Post-competition

Those being voted out many contestants including Prachi Agarwal gained much fame among Facebook and Twitter groups and have been highly appreciated by the audience. However, others candidates which were considered foul mouthed by majority of the viewers have received a very negative response. Renee, Anchal, Dev and Avatar are some of them. The viewers commenting on their disappointing act on the show have made many Facebook hate pages. Raghu has also criticized these participants in many graveyard episodes.

Suraj a.k.a. Nagesh has also received a very critical review after his vote-out, from Raghu and Rannvijay in a graveyard episode due to his manoeuvre of faking his identity throughout the show without seeking attention. In the last week of roadies Suraj was blasted by Raghu and Rajiv for faking his identity. He himself agreed to the fact that he lied regarding his mother's death to get into the show. He was humiliated by comparing him with Donkey. However, at Suraj's vote for Mohit in the final vote-out (he wrote "Mohit, no matter what, you are a winner bro"), Raghu said he redeemed himself.

Renee Dhyani who repeatedly abused other contestants pleaded everyone to forgive her explaining that she was raised like a boy and only abused people to get attention.

Critical reception of the winner

Aanchal Khurana, the second female roadies winner, has been widely criticized by the audience after her win. The Roadies Grand Finale II episode received the least rating so far at 1.69/5 and has been credited as the worst Roadies episode till date. The viewers were appalled to see that a vote was considered to decide the winner unlike the previous seasons where usually a final task is performed to decide the winner. Moreover, Aanchal Khurana being declared the winner stated that "Not only boys, even girls also can win the show", added fuel to the wide belief that she won the show only as a result of sympathy votes to elect a girl as Roadies winner. She's still ridiculed on many Facebook and Twitter groups and pages with the audience crying hoarse that she didn't deserve to win the show. All through the show she was known for abusing the contestants with Renee. But Raghu and Raajiv said that most of the people don't know how tough it is to get to the finale and therefore it is justified that Aanchal won.

The Indian tribune is reported to have said the following about the winner "MTV Roadies Season 8 had a very disappointing end on the internet and for TV audience. Masses were not happy with the finale, and didn't think that Aanchal deserved to win. The dissatisfied viewers went full throttle on the social networking sites, posting comments on their own profiles as well as the MTV Roadies page. The grand finale, as and when it was being telecast, got a flurry of comments on Twitter and Facebook- with most people ranting about how big a let down this season has turned out to be. As soon as the episodes were uploaded on YouTube, there were people commenting on the videos and they clearly were not too happy."

Voting history

 Prachi was voted-out on the basis of votes in Pile 2 which consisted of 2 votes against her and one against Mohit. Votes that were not counted appear in Grey background.
 In order to break the tie between Mohit and Suraj that resulted because of equal votes against both of them, Nihal was told to change his vote from Pooja (his first choice) to vote against either one of them. Hence, Nihal chose Suraj.

Roadies summary

   Winner
  1st Runner-up
    2nd Runner-up
  Unplaced

Ex-roadies

Roadies history
 Key
  – The Contestant won the Competition
  – Contestant eliminated as a result of losing a task against an opponent
  – Contestant returned as a wild card entry
  – Contestant was voted out of the competition by other roadies
  – Contestant returned as a wild card entry but could not qualify for a place

 Prachi initially came as an audience for the finale but was told to perform as a contender which could result her coming back on the show as a finalist. However, Prachi was defeated by Anchal in the Rope-pulling task.
 Avtar initially arrived as an audience for the finale but was kicked out of the location due to his controversial talks regarding the crew members of the show.

 = Indicates that the Roadie was present in the episode.

 = Indicates that the Roadie was absent in the episode.

 = Indicates that the roadies was present in the episode but as a part of the audience for watching the Finale rather than as a contestant for the title.

References

External links
 Mtv Roadies 9 Information Online

MTV Roadies
2011 Indian television seasons